In enzymology, a glutamate-1-semialdehyde 2,1-aminomutase is an enzyme that catalyzes the chemical reaction

L-glutamate 1-semialdehyde  5-aminolevulinate

Hence, this enzyme has one substrate, L-glutamate-1-semialdehyde, and one product, 5-aminolevulinate.

This enzyme belongs to the family of isomerases, specifically those intramolecular transferases transferring amino groups.  The systematic name of this enzyme class is (S)-4-amino-5-oxopentanoate 4,5-aminomutase. This enzyme is also called glutamate-1-semialdehyde aminotransferase.  This enzyme participates in porphyrin and chlorophyll biosynthesis.  It employs one cofactor, pyridoxal phosphate.

Structural studies

References

 

EC 5.4.3
Pyridoxal phosphate enzymes
Enzymes of known structure